Sołki may refer to:

Sołki, Masovian Voivodeship, a village in east-central Poland
Sołki, Podlaskie Voivodeship, a village in northeastern Poland